The Alliance Academy International is a private, co-educational, international, Christian school located in Quito, Ecuador, with a curriculum based on a United States program of education. AAI was founded in 1929 as the Alliance Academy, to provide an English-language American education for the children of missionaries of the Christian and Missionary Alliance (C&MA) and is now an independent school that serves many nationalities in an English immersion setting with a Christian worldview. The academy is located in a section of north Quito known as Iñaquito or uptown Quito.

History
Since 1966, AAI has been fully accredited by the Southern Association of Colleges and Schools (SACS/AdvancED/Cognia) and the Association of Christian Schools International (ACSI).  The academy is a member of the Association of American Schools in South America and the Southern Association of Independent Schools.  It is also a member of the Association of American Schools in South America (AASSA) and is a charter member of the Council of Educational Standards & Accountability (CESA).  AAI is also certified by the Ecuadorian Ministry of Education, which results in graduates receiving both Ecuadorian and US diplomas; these fully accredited diplomas are recognized locally, in every university in the US, and around the world.  In 2006 AAI became independent of the C&MA and is now an international school that serves both Ecuadorians and expatriates from all walks of life from nearly 30 different countries.

Description

AAI enrolls 570 students in PK-3 through 12th grade, coming from over thirty nations in Asia, Europe and the Americas.  The school has a wide variety of activities available for both students and adults, ranging from competitive interscholastic sports, to family activity days like Harvest Fest and Spring Festival, to community service projects around Ecuador. There are 160 total staff members, including 85 licensed and certified teachers, many with advanced degrees, working at the Alliance Academy International.

Christian Life
There are weekly chapel services for students of all ages. The secondary students have chapels that feature a student praise band and a variety of speakers, while the elementary students have age-level chapels that include activities, small group interaction, and music.  Both the Elementary and Secondary Divisions have their own dedicated chaplain who seeks to make biblical content relevant while mentoring students throughout their experience at the school.

Construction
Campus improvement and expansion has been underway, including expansion the Early Childhood facilities, as well as for improvements in the Secondary School and athletic facilities.

STUCO
The Academy runs a Student Government based on democracy, with its key members petitioning to meet the student body's needs and improve the school campus. Students are able to participate in the government from seventh grade and up, with seniors taking the most important roles.
STUCO's goal is not only to be leaders, but to be servant leaders that show Christian attributes. Ranking STUCO members are required to participate in meetings every week during lunch and make themselves available to lead through service to others.

References

External links 
 

American international schools in Ecuador
International schools in Quito
Association of American Schools in South America
1929 establishments in Ecuador
Educational institutions established in 1929